The men's doubles tournament at the 1981 US Open was held on September 1–13, 1981 on the outdoor hard courts at the USTA National Tennis Center in New York City, United States. Heinz Günthardt and Peter McNamara forfeited the title to Peter Fleming and John McEnroe in the final.

Seeds

Draw

Finals

Top half

Section 1

Section 2

Bottom half

Section 3

Section 4

External links
 Main draw
1981 US Open – Men's draws and results at the International Tennis Federation

Men's Doubles
US Open (tennis) by year – Men's doubles